John D. Richard   (born July 30, 1934) was the Chief Justice of Canada's Federal Court of Appeal and in 2013, was listed as a NAFTA adjudicator.

Richard was born in Ottawa, Ontario, and received a Bachelor of Arts degree in political science from the University of Ottawa in 1955, followed by his law studies at Osgoode Hall Law School, where he received the gold medal and the Chancellor Van Koughnet Scholarship in 1959. He was called to the Bar of Ontario in that year, continuing his studies for an Honours Licentiate in Political & Social Sciences from Louvain University in 1960.

He then practised law as a trial lawyer at two firms throughout his legal career, from 1960 until 1994, when he was appointed as a judge. He was created Queen's Counsel in 1976. In 1994, he was appointed as a judge on the Federal Court of Canada's Trial Division, followed by his appointment as associate chief justice in 1998.

The court's name was changed to the Federal Court of Appeal, and he was appointed Chief Justice in 1999 by Prime Minister Jean Chrétien. Richard served until September 2009, when he retired.

Richard then became the Honorary Chairperson of Reach Canada, an NGO located in Ottawa that assists people with disabilities to get legal help. In June 2012, Richard was named to the Order of Canada.

References

External links
 John D. Richard at the Federal Court of Appeal

1934 births

Lawyers in Ontario
University of Ottawa alumni
People from Ottawa
Living people
Judges of the Federal Court of Appeal (Canada)
Officers of the Order of Canada
Osgoode Hall Law School alumni
Catholic University of Leuven (1834–1968) alumni